Cuthbert Victor (born January 30, 1983) is a U.S. Virgin Islander professional basketball player who last played for the Incheon ET Land Elephants of the Korean Basketball League. Nicknamed the "Greek God" by Virgin Island fans, he is a long-time member of the U.S. Virgin Islands national basketball team.

College career
Victor played college basketball at Murray State University.  In his four years there, he established himself as a dominant force for the Racers.  Despite flying under the radar, he has been called one of the best players in Murray State Racer history, and was once named CollegehoopsNet Unsung Player of the week.  

Victor graduated as the all-time Racer leader in career blocks (160).  He also ranks in the top 6 on the school's career list in rebounds, field goal percentage, and steals, and is 14th in career points.  During his time at the university, he led the team to the NCAA Tournament twice, in 2002 and 2004. After a senior season in which he averaged 14.6 points and 10.2 rebounds per game, he was named Ohio Valley Conference Player of the Year.

Professional career
After graduating, Victor began his career in Spain for CAI Zaragoza for the 2004–05 season. He has spent his entire career in Spain, first for Zaragoza and then with Melilla Baloncesto. In the 2008–09 season with Melilla, he averaged 14 points and 6.3 rebounds per game in 37 games for the team and was a candidate for League MVP.  On July 28, 2009, he signed with another Spanish team, Menorca Bàsquet, for the 2009–10 season; where with the team and his help, achieved ending in second place and go to ACB league, one of the best leagues around the world. In August 2011 he signed with Spartak Primorye in Russia.

National team career
Victor is a long-time member of the U.S. Virgin Islands national basketball team.  He has been with the team since 1999 and competed for the team at the 2003, 2007, and FIBA Americas Championship 2009.  He was the fourth leading overall scorer at the 2008 Centrobasket tournament and top overall rebounder while averaging 21.8 points and 10 rebounds per game for the Virgin Islands.  He was also the team's leading scorer with 16.6 points per game at the 2006 Centrobasket.  The Virgin Islands won the silver medal at both tournaments.

References

External links
VTB League profile
Player profile at ACB.com 

1983 births
Living people
American expatriate basketball people in Spain
Basketball players at the 2007 Pan American Games
Basket Zaragoza players
BC Krasny Oktyabr players
BC Spartak Primorye players
Cantabria Baloncesto players
Capitanes de Arecibo players
CB Tarragona players
Daegu KOGAS Pegasus players
Le Mans Sarthe Basket players
Liga ACB players
Melilla Baloncesto players
Menorca Bàsquet players
Murray State Racers men's basketball players
Pan American Games competitors for the United States Virgin Islands
People from Saint Croix, U.S. Virgin Islands
Ulsan Hyundai Mobis Phoebus players
United States Virgin Islands men's basketball players
United States Virgin Islands expatriate sportspeople
Power forwards (basketball)